In physics, a ferromagnetic material is said to have magnetocrystalline anisotropy if it takes more energy to magnetize it in certain directions than in others.  These directions are usually related to the principal axes of its  crystal lattice. It is a special case of magnetic anisotropy. In other words, the excess energy required to magnetize a specimen in a particular direction over that required to magnetize it along the easy direction is called crystalline anisotropy energy.

Causes 
The spin-orbit interaction is the primary source of magnetocrystalline anisotropy. It is basically the orbital motion of the electrons which couples with crystal electric field giving rise to the first order contribution to magnetocrystalline anisotropy. The second order arises due to the mutual interaction of the magnetic dipoles. This effect is weak compared to the exchange interaction and is difficult to compute from first principles, although some successful computations have been made.

Practical relevance 
Magnetocrystalline anisotropy has a great influence on industrial uses of ferromagnetic materials.  Materials with high magnetic anisotropy usually have high coercivity, that is, they are hard to demagnetize.  These are called "hard" ferromagnetic materials and are used to make permanent magnets.  For example, the high anisotropy of rare-earth metals is mainly responsible for the strength of rare-earth magnets.  During manufacture of magnets, a powerful magnetic field aligns the microcrystalline grains of the metal such that their "easy" axes of magnetization all point in the same direction, freezing a strong magnetic field into the material.

On the other hand, materials with low magnetic anisotropy usually have low coercivity, their magnetization is easy to change.  These are called "soft" ferromagnets and are used to make magnetic cores for transformers and inductors.  The small energy required to turn the direction of magnetization minimizes core losses, energy dissipated in the transformer core when the alternating current changes direction.

Thermodynamic theory
The magnetocrystalline anisotropy energy is generally represented as an expansion in powers of the direction cosines of the magnetization. The magnetization vector can be written , where  is the saturation magnetization. Because of time reversal symmetry, only even powers of the cosines are allowed. The nonzero terms in the expansion depend on the crystal system (e.g., cubic or hexagonal). The order of a term in the expansion is the sum of all the exponents of magnetization components, e.g.,  is second order.

Uniaxial anisotropy

More than one kind of crystal system has a single axis of high symmetry (threefold, fourfold or sixfold). The anisotropy of such crystals is called uniaxial anisotropy. If the  axis is taken to be the main symmetry axis of the crystal, the lowest order term in the energy is

The ratio  is an energy density (energy per unit volume).

The minima in this energy with respect to  satisfy

 
If ,
the directions of lowest energy are the  directions. The  axis is called the easy axis. If , there is an easy plane perpendicular to the symmetry axis (the basal plane of the crystal).

Many models of magnetization represent the anisotropy as uniaxial and ignore higher order terms. However, if , the lowest energy term does not determine the direction of the easy axes within the basal plane. For this, higher-order terms are needed, and these depend on the crystal system (hexagonal, tetragonal or rhombohedral).

Hexagonal system

In a hexagonal system the  axis is an axis of sixfold rotation symmetry. The energy density is, to fourth 
order,

The uniaxial anisotropy is mainly determined by these first two terms.

 : the ferromagnet is isotropic.
  and : the  axis is an easy axis.
  and : the basal plane is an easy plane.
  and : the basal plane is an easy plane.
 : the ferromagnet has an easy cone (see figure to right).

The basal plane anisotropy is determined by the third term, which is sixth-order. The easy directions are projected onto three axes in the basal plane.

Below are some room-temperature anisotropy constants for hexagonal ferromagnets.

Higher order constants, in particular conditions, may lead to first order magnetization processes FOMP.

Tetragonal and rhombohedral systems
The energy density for a tetragonal crystal is

.

Note that the  term, the one that determines the basal plane anisotropy, is fourth order (same as the  term). The definition of  may vary by a constant multiple between publications.

The energy density for a rhombohedral crystal is

.

Cubic anisotropy

In a cubic crystal the lowest order terms in the energy are

These are given in the table below, along with hard axes (directions of greatest energy) and intermediate axes (saddle points) in the energy). In energy surfaces like those on the right, the easy axes are analogous to valleys, the hard axes to peaks and the intermediate axes to mountain passes.

Below are some room-temperature anisotropy constants for cubic ferromagnets. The compounds involving  are ferrites, an important class of ferromagnets. In general the anisotropy parameters for cubic ferromagnets are higher than those for uniaxial ferromagnets. This is consistent with the fact that the lowest order term in the expression for cubic anisotropy is fourth order, while that for uniaxial anisotropy is second order.

Temperature dependence of anisotropy

The magnetocrystalline anisotropy parameters have a strong dependence on temperature. They generally decrease rapidly as the temperature approaches the Curie temperature, so the crystal becomes effectively isotropic. Magnetite, a mineral of great importance to rock magnetism and paleomagnetism, has an isotropic point at 130 kelvin.

Magnetite also has a phase transition at which the crystal symmetry changes from cubic (above) to monoclinic or possibly triclinic below. The temperature at which this occurs, called the Verwey temperature, is 120 Kelvin.

Magnetostriction

The magnetocrystalline anisotropy parameters are generally defined for ferromagnets that are constrained to remain undeformed as the direction of magnetization changes. However, coupling between the magnetization and the lattice does result in deformation, an effect called magnetostriction. To keep the lattice from deforming, a stress must be applied. If the crystal is not under stress, magnetostriction alters the effective magnetocrystalline anisotropy. If a ferromagnet is single domain (uniformly magnetized), the effect is to change the magnetocrystalline anisotropy parameters.

In practice, the correction is generally not large. In cubic crystals, there is a small change, as in the table below.

See also
Anisotropy energy

Notes and references

Further reading

Magnetic ordering
Orientation (geometry)
Ferromagnetism